Klaus Gunter Fischer (November 12, 1943 – July 2, 2009) was a German-American mathematician of German origin. He worked on a wide range of problems in algebraic geometry, commutative algebra, graph theory, and combinatorics.

Fischer was chair of the Mathematics Department at George Mason University at the time of his death.

References

External links 

1943 births
2009 deaths
20th-century American mathematicians
21st-century American mathematicians
20th-century German mathematicians
21st-century German mathematicians
Group theorists
George Mason University faculty
Northwestern University alumni